The Kentucky Military Institute (KMI) was a military preparatory school in Lyndon, Kentucky, and Venice, Florida, in operation from 1845 to 1971.

Founding 
One of the oldest traditional military prep schools in the United States, KMI was maintained in the vain of the Virginia Military Institute, in that all of its students were classified as cadets. It was founded in 1845 by Colonel Robert Thomas Pritchard Allen (September 26, 1813, to July 9, 1888) and chartered by the Commonwealth of Kentucky in 1847.

History 
As the Civil War approached, a student "set the buildings on fire and the school was closed down," according to E. F. Bleiler. During the Civil War, the school remained closed.

KMI wintered in Eau Gallie, Florida, beginning in 1907 (when it bought that ghost town) to 1921 (when the Eau Gallie campus burned to the ground).

Due to financial troubles, the Florida campus moved many times in the late 19th and early 20th centuries, and was closed in 1924; it reopened the next year. It moved to Venice, Florida, in 1932, where winter classes were already being held. Charles B. Richmond was appointed as superintendent and the school thrived until the late 1960s.

Closure 
The main campus in Lyndon, Kentucky, which was located on the outskirts of Louisville, Kentucky, began its decline when dwindling interest in enrolling in the military, coupled with higher tuition fees, caused the school further financial trouble. Its final class of cadets graduated in 1971, and closed for good that summer. 

The campus re-opened the next year as the Kentucky Academy and became a non-military co-ed school. However, it was soon merged into Kentucky Country Day School. The old campus was then used by the Stewart Home School.

Notable alumni

 Glendy B. Arnold, St. Louis judge
 Jim Backus, actor; credits included Thurston Howell III on Gilligan's Island
 John Y. Brown Jr., Governor of Kentucky (attended)
 William Denis Brown, III; lawyer, businessman, state senator from Monroe, Louisiana; attended from 1948 to 1949 
 Stephen Gano Burbridge, Union Army major general
 Bruce Hoblitzell, mayor of Louisville and sheriff of Jefferson County
 Robert Hoke, Confederate major general
 Robert A. McClure (Class of 1915), Chief of Intelligence to General Eisenhower's Allied Forces in Europe during World War II
 Victor Mature, actor; credits include Samson and Delilah, My Darling Clementine
 Wendell H. Meade, U.S. Representative from Kentucky
 Samuel Woodson Price, artist & soldier; Union Army major general
 Danny Sullivan, race car driver; winner of the 1985 Indianapolis 500
 Fred Willard (Class of 1951), actor; numerous television and film credits include Best in Show and This Is Spinal Tap

References

External links
 

Educational institutions established in 1845
Defunct schools in Kentucky
Defunct United States military academies
Buildings and structures in Sarasota County, Florida
Defunct schools in Florida
1971 disestablishments in the United States
1845 establishments in Kentucky
Schools in Franklin County, Kentucky
Lyndon, Kentucky